Četiri godišnja doba (English: The Four Seasons) is an EP from Serbian and former Yugoslav rock band Bajaga i Instruktori, released in 1991.

The album features four songs, each one representing a different season.

The EP featured the opera singer Jadranka Jovanović as guest.

Track listing
All the songs were written by Momčilo Bajagić, except where noted.
"Dobro jutro (Leto)" – 3:32
"Uspavanka (Jesen)" – 3:31
"U koži krokodila (Zima)" (Žika Milenković, M. Bajagić) – 3:00
"Buđenje ranog proleća" – 4:36

Personnel
Momčilo Bajagić - vocals, guitar, arranged by, producer
Žika Milenković - vocals, arranged by
Miroslav Cvetković - bass guitar, arranged by, recorded by, producer
Saša Lokner - keyboards, arranged by, producer
Nenad Stamatović - guitar
Vladimir Golubović - drums

Additional personnel
Jadranka Jovanović - vocals
Saša Habić - guitar, producer
Branko Mačić - guitar

References
Četiri godišnja doba at Discogs
 EX YU ROCK enciklopedija 1960-2006,  Janjatović Petar;

External links
Četiri godišnja doba at Discogs

Bajaga i Instruktori EPs
1991 EPs